The 1939 Chicago White Sox season was the team's 39th season in major league baseball, and its 40th season overall. They finished with a record of 86–69, good enough for 4th place in the American League, 22 games behind the first place New York Yankees.

Regular season

Season standings

Record vs. opponents

Opening Day lineup 
 Marv Owen, 3B
 Hank Steinbacher, RF
 Gee Walker, LF
 Luke Appling, SS
 Mike Kreevich, CF
 Joe Kuhel, 1B
 Eric McNair, 2B
 Ken Silvestri, C
 Johnny Rigney, P

Roster

Player stats

Batting 
Note: G = Games played; AB = At bats; R = Runs scored; H = Hits; 2B = Doubles; 3B = Triples; HR = Home runs; RBI = Runs batted in; BB = Base on balls; SO = Strikeouts; AVG = Batting average; SB = Stolen bases

Pitching 
Note: W = Wins; L = Losses; ERA = Earned run average; G = Games pitched; GS = Games started; SV = Saves; IP = Innings pitched; H = Hits allowed; R = Runs allowed; ER = Earned runs allowed; HR = Home runs allowed; BB = Walks allowed; K = Strikeouts

Farm system 

LEAGUE CHAMPIONS: Lubbock

Notes

References 
 1939 Chicago White Sox at Baseball Reference

Chicago White Sox seasons
Chicago White Sox season
Chicago White Sox